The Round Barn, Bruce Township Section 3 is located in Bruce Township, Benton County, Iowa, United States. It was built in 1910 for use as a cattle barn. The building is a true round barn that measures  in diameter. The barn is constructed of clay tile and features a conical roof. The structure does not have a cupola, but there is a silo that rises through the center. There is also a round machine shed on the same property. It has been listed on the National Register of Historic Places since 1986.

References

Infrastructure completed in 1910
Buildings and structures in Benton County, Iowa
Barns on the National Register of Historic Places in Iowa
Round barns in Iowa
National Register of Historic Places in Benton County, Iowa